The year 1683 in music involved some significant events.

Events 
 Henry Purcell becomes organ maker and keeper of the king's instruments at the Chapel Royal.
 Guillaume-Gabriel Nivers publishes his Dissertation sur le chant grégorien
 Thomas D’Urfey publishes New Collection of Songs and Poems
 Michel Richard Delalande appointed Chapel Master for Versailles by King Louis XIV

Classical music 
 Giovanni Battista Bassani – 12 sinfonie, Op. 5
 Heinrich Biber – Fidicinium sacro-profanum
 Dietrich Buxtehude 
 Canite Jesu nostro, BuxWV 11
 Gott fähret auf mit Jauchzen, BuxWV 33
 Ich bin die Auferstehung und das Leben, BuxWV 44
 Ich halte es dafür, BuxWV 48
 Marc Antoine Charpentier 
 Pro omnibus festis B V M, H.333
 Orphée descendant aux enfers, H.471
 Ouverture pour l’église, H.524
 Michel Richard Delalande 
 Les fontaines de Versailles, S.133, premiered April 5 in Versailles
 Concert d'Esculape, S.134, premiered in May in Versailles
 De profundis, a grand motet, first performed in September, in the Saint Denis Basilica (burial site of French monarchs), for the repose of the soul of Queen Marie-Therèse
 Isabella Leonarda – 12 Sonatas, Op.16
 Johann Pachelbel – Musicalische Sterbens-Gedancken, which included:
 Christus, der ist mein Leben, P.376
 Alle Menschen müssen sterben, P.377a
 Hertzlich tut mich verlangen, P.378
 Was Gott thut, das ist wolgethan, P.379
 Freu dich sehr o meine Seele
 Various Suites for keyboard
 David Petersen – Speelstukken
 Henry Purcell 
 Fly, bold rebellion, Z.324
 From hardy climes and dangerous toils of war, Z.325
 Sonnata's of III. Parts (set of 12 trio sonatas, for two violins, bass, and basso continuo), published in London, Z.790-801
Daniel Speer – Türkischer Vagant

Opera 
 John Blow – Venus and Adonis
 Domenico Gabrielli – Il Gige in Lidia
 Leopold I, Holy Roman Emperor – Der thöreichte Schaffer
 Jean-Baptiste Lully – Phaëton
 Alessandro Scarlatti – Pompeo

Births
 January – Anthony Young, organist and composer (died 1747)
 January 14 – Gottfried Silbermann, German constructor of keyboard instruments (died 1753)
 April 17 – Johann David Heinichen, composer (died 1729)
 September 25 – Jean-Philippe Rameau, composer (died 1764)
 date unknown
 Christoph Graupner, composer (died 1760)
 Johann David Heinichen, composer and music theorist (died 1729)
 Pierre-Charles Roy, librettist (died 1764)

Deaths 
 September 6 – Johann Melchior Gletle, organist and composer (born 1626)
 December 15 – Izaak Walton, librettist (born c. 1594)
 date unknown
 Solomon Eccles, composer (born 1618)
 John Hingston, organist, violist and composer
 Nathaniel Ingelo, writer and musician (born c.1621)
 Johann Sebastiani, composer (born 1622)
 Jacob Stainer, luthier (born c.1617)
 Alessandro Poglietti, organist and composer

References

 
17th century in music
Music by year